Razaleigh Khalik (born 25 June 1981) is a former professional soccer player who played in the S.League and the Singapore national football team.

He is a natural centre back, though he can also play as a right full back and left full back.

Club career
Razaleigh has previously played for Geylang United and Young Lions.

International career
He made his debut for the Singapore against Maldives on 4 March 2003.

Honours

Club

Geylang United
S.League: 2001

Singapore Armed Forces
S.League: 2002,2008,2009
Singapore Cup: 2008

External links
data2.7m.cn

safwarriors.com.sg

Singaporean footballers
Singapore international footballers
Warriors FC players
1981 births
Living people
Association football defenders
Geylang International FC players
Young Lions FC players
Singapore Premier League players